Kenneth Duane Snelson (June 29, 1927 – December 22, 2016) was an American contemporary sculptor and photographer.  His sculptural works are composed of flexible and rigid components arranged according to the idea of 'tensegrity'. Snelson preferred the descriptive term floating compression.

Snelson said his former professor Buckminster Fuller took credit for Snelson's discovery of the concept that Fuller named tensegrity. Fuller gave the idea its name, combining 'tension' and 'structural integrity.' Kārlis Johansons had exhibited tensegrity sculptures several years before Snelson was even born. The height and strength of Snelson's sculptures, which are often delicate in appearance, depend on the tension between rigid pipes and flexible cables.

Biography 

Snelson was born in Pendleton, Oregon, in 1927. He studied at the University of Oregon in Eugene, at the Black Mountain College, and with Fernand Léger in Paris. His sculpture and photography have been exhibited at over 25 one-man shows in galleries around the world including the structurally seminal Park Place Gallery in New York in the 1960s. Snelson also did research on the shape of the atom. Snelson continued to work in his SoHo studio, occasionally collaborating with animator Jonathan Monaghan. He lived in New York City with his wife, Katherine.

He held five United States patents: #3,169,611: Discontinuous Compression Structures, February 1965; #3,276,148:  Model for Atomic Forms, October 1966; #4,099,339:  Model for Atomic Forms, July 1978; and #6,017,220: Magnetic Geometric Building System; and most recently, #6,739,937: Space Frame Structure Made by 3-D Weaving of Rod Members, May 25, 2004.

Snelson was a founding member of ConStruct, the artist-owned gallery that promoted and organized large-scale sculpture exhibitions throughout the United States. Other founding members include Mark di Suvero, John Raymond Henry, Lyman Kipp and Charles Ginnever.

After suffering from prostate cancer, Snelson died on December 22, 2016 at the age of 89.

Honours and awards 

 (1999) Lifetime Achievement in Contemporary Sculpture Award, International Sculpture Center.

Sculptures in public collections and public spaces

United States

Alabama 

 Mora Terry II, Birmingham Museum of Art, Birmingham

California 

 City Boots, 1968, J. Patrick Lannon Foundation, Los Angeles
 Mozart I, 1982, Stanford University, Palo Alto

District of Columbia 

 Needle Tower, 1968, Hirshhorn Museum and Sculpture Garden, Washington
 Untitled Maquette, 1975, Hirshhorn Museum and Sculpture Garden, Washington

Florida 

 Newport, 1968, M. Margulies, Coconut Grove
 Double City Boots, 1967, MDC Wolfson Campus, Miami
 X-Planar Tower, John and Mable Ringling Museum of Art, Sarasota

Iowa 

 Four Module Piece, 1968, Riverfront Crossings Park, Iowa City

Louisiana 

 Virlane Tower, 1981, Sydney and Walda Besthoff Sculpture Garden at NOMA, New Orleans

Maryland 

 B-Tree, 1981, National Institutes of Health, Bethesda
 Easy Landing, 1977, City of Baltimore, Baltimore
Six Number Two, 1967, Annmarie Sculpture Garden (Smithsonian partner/annex site), Solomons, Maryland

Massachusetts 

 Mozart III, 2008, Science Center, Wellesley College, Wellesley,

Michigan 

 Indexer II, 2001, University of Michigan, Ann Arbor
 B-Tree II, 2005, Frederik Meijer Gardens & Sculpture Park, Grand Rapids

Missouri 

 Triple Crown, 1991, Hallmark, Inc., Kansas City, Missouri, just north of 27th Street between Main Street and Grand Blvd, at the South end of the Crown Center complex.  The sculpture consists of 30–40 aluminum tubes held together and apart by steel cables.  The entire assembly is roughly 23 meters on each of three sides and roughly that tall, with the low point being roughly 5 meters above the ground.

Nebraska 

 Able Charlie, 1983, Joslyn Art Museum, Omaha

New York 

 Coronation Day, 1980, City of Buffalo, Buffalo
 E.C. Column, 1969–81, Albright-Knox Art Gallery, Buffalo
 Four Chances, 1982, Albright Knox Museum, Buffalo
 Fair Leda, 1969, Nelson Rockefeller Estate
 Free Ride Home, 1974, Storm King Art Center, Mountainville
 Mozart II, 1982, Donald M. Kendall Sculpture Garden at Pepsico, Purchase
 Sun River, 1967, Whitney Museum of American Art, New York
 One World Trade Center antenna/spire, 2006, One World Trade Center, New York

New Jersey 

 Northwood II, 1970, Compton Quad, Graduate College, Princeton, Mercer

North Carolina 

 Northwood II(maquette), 1970, Asheville Art Museum, Asheville

Pennsylvania 

 Forest Devil, 1975–77, Museum of Art, Carnegie Institute, Pittsburgh

Ohio 

 Forest Devil, 1975, University of Cincinnati, Cincinnati
 V-X, 1968, Columbus Museum of Art, Columbus

Oklahoma 

 Sleeping Dragon, 2002–03, Kirkpatrick Oil Company Building, Oklahoma City

Tennessee 

 Dragon II, 2005, Knoxville Museum of Art, Knoxville
 V-X-II, 1973-4, Hunter Museum, Chattanooga

Texas 

 Northwood, 1969, Northwood Institute, Cedar Hills

Vermont 

 "Hard Wired", Bennington (College)

Wisconsin 

 Northwoods III, 1970, Milwaukee Art Museum, Milwaukee

International

Germany 

 Soft Landing, 1975–77, Berlin Nationalgalerie, Berlin
 Avenue K, 1968, City of Hannover

The Netherlands 

 Easy-K, 1970, Sonsbeek ‘70, Arnhem
 Needle Tower II, 1969, Kröller Müller Museum, Otterlo

Japan 

 Osaka, 1970, Japan Iron & Steel Federation, Kobe
 T-Zone Flight, 1995, JT Building, Toranomon, Tokyo
 Landing, 1970, Wakayama Prefecture Museum, Wakayama

Location Unknown 

 Audrey I, 1966, Private Collection
 Audrey II, 1966, Private Collection
 Equilateral Quivering Tower, 1973–92
 Tri-Core Column, 1974
 Wing I, 1992; Ed. 4, Private collection : University of Puerto Rico – Mayaguez 
 Rainbow Arch, 2001
 Dragon, 2000–03

See also 

Space frame
Kārlis Johansons, tensegrity innovator

References 

Busch, Julia M., A Decade of Sculpture: the New Media in the 1960s (The Art Alliance Press: Philadelphia; Associated University Presses: London, 1974)

Further reading 

 Heartney, Eleanor, Kenneth Snelson: forces made visible/essay by Eleanor Heartney; additional text by Kenneth Snelson, Lenox, Massachusetts:  Hard Press Editions, 2009.
 Sande-Friedman, Amy, "Kenneth Snelson & the Science of Sculpture in 1960s America", Doctoral Dissertation, New York: Bard Graduate Center, 2012.

External links 

 Kenneth Snelson's official webpage
 Letter from Snelson to R. Motro regarding Fuller's role in 'discovering' Tensegrity
 Snelson interview with Robert Ayers, March 2009

1927 births
2016 deaths
Black Mountain College alumni
Deaths from cancer in New York (state)
Deaths from prostate cancer
Members of the American Academy of Arts and Letters
Op art
People from Pendleton, Oregon
Sculptors from Oregon
University of Oregon alumni